Pyostomatitis vegetans is an inflammatory stomatitis and most often seen in association with inflammatory bowel disease, namely ulcerative colitis and Crohn's disease. Uncommonly, it may be one of the features of orofacial granulomatosis.

See also 
 Cheilitis
 Skin lesion
 List of cutaneous

References

External links 
 Pyostomatitis vegetans associated with inflammatory bowel disease

Conditions of the mucous membranes
Reactive neutrophilic cutaneous conditions